Nikita Vladilenovich Ermolaev (born 11 July 1991) is a Russian pair skater. Competing with Goda Butkutė for Lithuania, he has won five senior international medals, including three on the ISU Challenger Series.

Personal life 
Nikita Ermolaev was born on 11 July 1991 in Leningrad (Saint Petersburg), Russia.

Career 
Ermolaev started skating in 1999. As a single skater, he was coached by Valentina Chebotareva. In the 2011–12 season, he competed with Daria Beklemisheva in pair skating. Coached by Nikolai Velikov in Saint Petersburg, the pair placed tenth at the 2012 Russian Junior Championships.

Partnership with Butkutė 
Ermolaev's partnership with Lithuanian skater Goda Butkutė began in the 2012–13 season. They competed only in Lithuania and Russia during their first three seasons as a pair.

Representing Lithuania, Butkutė/Ermolaev appeared in their first International Skating Union competitions in the 2015–16 season. Konstantin Bezmaternykh coaches the pair in Saint Petersburg. They were awarded silver at their first event, the Lombardia Trophy in September 2015. In October, they won bronze at the 2015 Mordovian Ornament, their ISU Challenger Series (CS) debut. In November, the pair placed fourth at the 2015 CS Tallinn Trophy and took bronze at the 2015 CS Warsaw Cup.

In January 2016, Butkutė/Ermolaev placed 11th in both segments and overall at the European Championships in Bratislava. In March, they competed at the 2016 World Championships in Boston; ranked 17th in the short program, they missed qualifying for the free skate by one spot.

Programs 
(with Butkutė)

Competitive highlights 
GP: Grand Prix; CS: Challenger Series

With Butkutė for Lithuania

With Beklemisheva for Russia

References

External links 
 

1991 births
Russian male pair skaters
Living people
Figure skaters from Saint Petersburg